Gösta Napoleon Adamsson (17 November 1924 – 14 January 2013) was a Norwegian-born rower who represented Sweden. He competed in the 1952 Summer Olympics.

References

1924 births
2013 deaths
Rowers at the 1952 Summer Olympics
Swedish male rowers
Olympic rowers of Sweden
Rowers from Oslo